Alexander Nikolayevich Sokurov, PAR (born 14 June 1951) is a Russian filmmaker. His most significant works include a feature film, Russian Ark (2002), filmed in a single unedited shot, and Faust (2011), which was honoured with the Golden Lion, the highest prize for the best film at the Venice Film Festival.

Life and work
Sokurov was born in Podorvikha, Irkutsky District, in Siberia, into a military officer's family. He graduated from the History Department of the Nizhny Novgorod University in 1974 and entered one of the VGIK studios the following year. There he became friends with Tarkovsky and was deeply influenced by his film Mirror. Most of Sokurov's early features were banned by Soviet authorities. During his early period, he produced numerous documentaries, including The Dialogues with Solzhenitsyn and a reportage about Grigori Kozintsev's flat in Saint Petersburg. His film Mournful Unconcern was nominated for the Golden Bear at the 37th Berlin International Film Festival in 1987.

Mother and Son (1997) was his first internationally acclaimed feature film. It was entered into the 20th Moscow International Film Festival where it won the Special Silver St. George. It was mirrored by Father and Son (2003), which baffled the critics with its implicit homoeroticism (though Sokurov himself has criticized this particular interpretation). Susan Sontag included two Sokurov features among her ten favorite films of the 1990s, saying: "There’s no director active today whose films I admire as much." In 2006, he received the Master of Cinema Award of the International Filmfestival Mannheim-Heidelberg.

Sokurov is a Cannes Film Festival regular, with four of his movies having debuted there. However, until 2011, Sokurov didn't win top awards at major international festivals. For a long time, his most commercially and critically successful film was the semi-documentary Russian Ark (2002), acclaimed primarily for its visually hypnotic images and single unedited shot.

Sokurov has filmed a tetralogy exploring the corrupting effects of power. The first three installments were dedicated to prominent 20th-century rulers: Moloch (1999), about Hitler, Taurus (2001), about Lenin, and The Sun (2005) about Hirohito. In 2011, Sokurov shot the last part of the series, Faust, a retelling of Goethe's tragedy. The film, depicting instincts and schemes of Faust in his lust for power, premiered on 8 September 2011 in competition at the 68th Venice International Film Festival. The film won the Golden Lion, the highest award of the Venice Festival. Producer Andrey Sigle said about Faust: "The film has no particular relevance to contemporary events in the worldit is set in the early 19th centurybut reflects Sokurov's enduring attempts to understand man and his inner forces."

The military world of the former USSR is one of Sokurov's ongoing interests, because of his personal connections to the subject and because the military marked the lives of a large part of population of the USSR. Three of his works, Spiritual Voices: From the Diaries of a War, Confession, From the Commander’s Diary and Soldier’s Dream revolve around military life. Confession has been screened at several independent film festivals, while the other two are virtually unknown.

In 1994 Sokurov accompanied Russian troops to a post on the Tajikistan-Afghanistan border. The result was Spiritual Voices: From the Diaries of a War, a 327-minute cinematic meditation on the war and the spirit of the Russian army. Landscape photography is featured in the film, but the music (including works by Mozart, Messiaen and Beethoven) and the sound are also particularly important. Soldiers' jargon and the combination of animal sounds, sighs and other location sounds in the fog and other visual effects give the film a phantasmagorical feel. The film brings together all the elements that characterize Sokurov's films: long takes, elaborate filming and image processing methods, a mix of documentary and fiction, the importance of the landscape and the sense of a filmmaker who brings transcendence to everyday gestures.

On the journey from Russia to the border post, in the film, fear never leaves the faces of the young soldiers. Sokurov captures their physical toil and their mental desolation, as well as daily rituals such as meals, sharing tobacco, writing letters and cleaning duties. There is no start or end to the dialogues; Sokurov negates conventional narrative structure. The final part of the film celebrates the arrival of the New Year, 1995, but the happiness is fleeting. The following day, everything remains the same: the endless waiting at a border post, the fear and the desolation.

In Confession: From the Commander’s Diary, Sokurov films officers from the Russian Navy, showing the monotony and lack of freedom of their everyday lives. The dialogue allows us to follow the reflections of a Ship Commander. Sokurov and his crew went aboard a naval patrol ship headed for Kuvshinka, a naval base in the Murmansk region, in the Barents Sea. Confined within the limited space of a ship anchored in Arctic waters, the team filmed the sailors as they went about their routine activities.

Soldier's Dream is another Sokurov film that deals with military themes. It contains no dialogue. This film actually came out of the material edited for one of the scenes in part three of Spiritual Voices. Soldier's Dream was screened at the Oberhausen Film Festival in Germany in 1995when Spiritual Voices was still at the editing stageas Sokurov's homage to the art critic and historian Hans Schlegel, in acknowledgement of his contributions in support of Eastern European filmmakers.

He suffers from severe eyesight problems.

Studio 

In 2010 Sokurov launched his personal course at the Kabardino-Balkarian State University in Nalchik. In 2015, 12 students graduated from his course, among them were such rising starts of cinema, as Kantemir Balagov, Vladimir Bitokov, Kira Kovalenko, and Alexander Zolotukhin.

Political stance 

During a December 2016 meeting of the Council for Culture and Arts, Sokurov appealed to President Vladimir Putin to reconsider the verdict against filmmaker Oleg Sentsov (which Putin refused).

In 2022, Sokurov criticized Kremlin and opposed the war in Ukraine. For this, in June 2022 he was denied the right to leave Russia.

Filmography

Feature films

Other works
The Degraded (Разжалованный, 1980)
Sonata for Viola. Dmitri Shostakovitch (1981)
Empire (Ампир, 1986)
Elegy (1986)
And Nothing More (1987)
Evening Sacrifice (1987)
Patience of Labour (1987)
Maria (Peasant Elegy) (1988)
Moscow Elegy (1988)
Sonata for Hitler (1989)
Soviet Elegy (1989)
Petersburg Elegy (1990)
To The Events In Transcaucasia (1990)
A Simple Elegy (1990)
A Retrospection of Leningrad (1957–1990) (1990)
An Example of Intonation (1991)
Elegy from Russia (1992)
Soldier's Dream (1995)
Spiritual Voices (1995)
Oriental Elegy (1996)
Robert. A Fortunate Life (1997)
A Humble Life (1997)
The St. Petersburg Diary: Inauguration of a monument to Dostoevsky (1997)
The St. Petersburg Diary: Kosintsev's Flat (1998)
Confession (1998)
The Dialogues with Solzhenitsyn (1998)
dolce… (1999)
Elegy of a Voyage (2001)
The St. Petersburg Diary: Mozart. Requiem (2004)
Elegy of a life: Rostropovich, Vishnevskaya (2006)

Awards
 Locarno International Film Festival, Bronze Leopard (The Lonely Voice of Man, 1987)
 Moscow International Film Festival, FIPRESCI Award (out of competition, The Lonely Voice of Man, 1987)
 Berlin International Film Festival, Award of the Forum special programme (Days of Eclipse, 1989)
 International Film Festival Rotterdam, FIPRESCI Award, KNF Award (Elegy, A Simple Elegy, 1991)
 State Prize of the Russian Federation (Mother and Son, 1997)
 State Prize of the Russian Federation (Moloch, Taurus, 2001)
 Russian Guild of Film Critics Prize for Best Director (Taurus, 2001)
 Nika Award for Best Director and Best Picture (Taurus, 2001)
 Toronto International Film Festival, IFC Vision Award (Russian Ark, 2002)
 São Paulo International Film Festival, Special Award for Lifetime Achievements (2002)
 Cannes Film Festival, FIPRESCI Award (Father and Son, 2003)
 Argentine Film Critics Association, The Silver Condor Award (Russian Ark, 2004)
 Yerevan International Film Festival, Golden Apricot for Best Picture (The Sun, 2005)
 Locarno International Film Festival, Leopard of Honour for Lifetime Achievements (2006)
 Venice Film Festival, Robert Bresson Award for spiritual search and promotion of human culture (2007)
 Venice Film Festival, Golden Lion for Best Picture (Faust, 2011)
 FEST, Belgrade Winner Award for his lifetime contribution to the art of film (2015)
 International Film Festival of Kerala, Lifetime Achievement Award for his lifetime contribution to world cinema (2017)

References

Sources
The Cinema of Alexander Sokurov (Kino – The Russian Cinema), ed. by Birgit Beumers and Nancy Condee, London: Tauris I B, 2011

External links

 Sokurov's home page
 
 The Island of Sokurov Stephen M. Norris, Russia Beyond the Headlines, 23 December 2009

1951 births
Living people
People from Irkutsk Oblast
Soviet film directors
Russian film directors
Soviet screenwriters
20th-century Russian screenwriters
Male screenwriters
20th-century Russian male writers
Gerasimov Institute of Cinematography alumni
German-language film directors
Directors of Golden Lion winners
Officiers of the Ordre des Arts et des Lettres
Recipients of the Nika Award
People's Artists of Russia
State Prize of the Russian Federation laureates
Academicians of the Russian Academy of Cinema Arts and Sciences "Nika"
Russian activists against the 2022 Russian invasion of Ukraine